The Bronx Zoo is an American drama television series that was directed by Allan Arkush and Paul Lynch that aired on NBC from March 19, 1987 to June 29, 1988. It lasted two seasons before cancelation.

Plot
Benjamin Harrison High School is set in the impoverished, unruly inner-city Bronx. Principal Joe Danzig (Edward Asner) does his best to maintain optimism, while dealing with the lack of motivation and direction of his staff.

Cast
 Edward Asner as Principal Joe Danzig
 Kathleen Beller as Mary Caitlin Callahan
 Jerry Levine as Matthew Littman
 Nicholas Pryor as Jack Feldspar
 Mykelti Williamson as Gus Butterfield
 David Wilson as Harry Barnes
 Kathryn Harrold as Sara Newhouse

Episodes

Season 1 (1987)

Season 2 (1987–88)

References

External links

1987 American television series debuts
1988 American television series endings
NBC original programming
1980s American drama television series
1980s American high school television series
Television series by CBS Studios
Television shows set in the Bronx
The Bronx
Television series created by Gary David Goldberg